Galliard (Gaillarde in French; Gagliarda in Italian) is Renaissance dance and associated music.

Galliard may refer to:

People
Johann Ernst Galliard (1687–1749), German composer
Léon Olphe-Galliard (1825–1893), French ornithologist
Pierce Galliard Smith (1826–1908), Australian Baptist Church rector
Christian Galliard de Lavernée (born 1950), French civil servant

Other
galliard (typography), another name for bourgeois-size type
Galliard (typeface), typeface designed by Matthew Carter
Galliard (horse), Thoroughbred racehorse

See also
Gaillard  (disambiguation)
Gallardo
Gaylord (disambiguation)